Greeley Central High School is the oldest of three public high schools in Greeley, Colorado, United States in Greeley-Evans School District 6. It was founded in 1895 as Greeley High School.

History
Formerly known as Greeley High, Greeley Central High School had its start in the late 1800s. The school's current building was completed in 1927 at a cost of $350,000. It is the fourth structure to be known as Greeley High School.  At the time, 14th Avenue was at the far western edge of the city, and this site was across the street from what had been a city dump.  Local Architect Sidney G. Frazier designed the school to resemble a French chateau.  Extensive remodels in 1958, 1974, 1994, and 2000 dramatically changed the interior and the campus, but the front remained virtually the same and has become known as "The Castle".

The name of the school was changed in 1965 to Greeley Central, under the leadership of principals Paul S. Gillespie, Robert S. Gilcrest, Wendell T. Blight, Wendell K. Beard, Henry C. Jensen, Wendell Wilson, Robert W. Turner, Franklin H. Bressler, Rex W. Hester, Cloyd MacBernd, John Lepetit, John "JC" Christensen, Jon Helwick and Mary Lauer.

In honor of the school's mascot, 14th Avenue in front of the school was renamed "Wildcat Way" in a 2004 ceremony by city, school and student leaders.

Athletics

Greeley Central competes in baseball, basketball, cheerleading, cross country, football, golf, soccer, swimming, softball, track & field, tennis, volleyball, and wrestling.

The Greeley Central Men's Tennis team is coached by Dave Mamich.  In 2015, Greeley Central won its first regional title in over decade, led by #1 singles player, Daniel Crews.  Crews won the #1 Singles regional title, becoming the first player in 14 years to win the title.

Notable alumni

 Tad Boyle, current head men's basketball coach at University of Colorado
 Joanna Cameron, actress, star of The Secrets of Isis
 Shawn Chacón, former major league baseball pitcher
 Kortne Ford, defender for the Colorado Rapids MLS 
 Harper Reed, former Chief Technology Officer of Obama for America
Michael Shellenberger, environmentalist and politician

References

External links

Public high schools in Colorado
Schools in Weld County, Colorado
Greeley, Colorado